The Herries Maxwell Trophy is a series of curling matches held every five years between Scotland and United States. The hosting country and the visiting country alternates. The visiting country sends a delegate of five men's teams (twenty curlers) to play a month-long tour at numerous curling clubs in the hosting country.

Results

2022 USA 977 Scotland 808

References

External links 

 Herries Maxwell History - Scottish Curling | The Home of Curling in Scotland
 2012
 2017
 2022
 GALLERY: Scottish Tour and Competition at the Utica Curling Club
 Curling competition friendly but 'still for real'
 CURLING: Carlson, Brunt help U.S. win Herries-Maxwell Trophy
 Scottish curling team will play 149 games in 10 US states in 3 weeks; faces curlers from Milwaukee, Wauwatosa | They'll play 149 games in 10 states... - FOX6 News Milwaukee
 Presentation of the Herries-Maxwell Trophy
 An Icy International Rivalry With Warm Relations
 2017 Scottish Men’s Tour to USA – Team Announcement - Scottish Curling

Curling trophies and awards
International curling competitions
Curling in the United States
Curling in Scotland